Parholaspididae is a family of mites in the order Mesostigmata.

Species

Gamasholaspis Berlese, 1903
 Gamasholaspis akimotoi (Ishikawa, 1966)
 Gamasholaspis anmashanensis Tseng, 1993
 Gamasholaspis blandus Tseng, 1993
 Gamasholaspis browningi (Bregetova & Koroleva, 1960)
 Gamasholaspis concavus Gu & Guo, 1996
 Gamasholaspis convexus Tseng, 1993
 Gamasholaspis duyunensis Chen, Guo & Gui, 1994
 Gamasholaspis eothenomydis Gu, 1984
 Gamasholaspis formosus Tseng, 1993
 Gamasholaspis gamasoides Berlese, 1903
 Gamasholaspis khaoyaiensis Ishikawa & Saichuae, 1997
 Gamasholaspis linae Petrova, 1977
 Gamasholaspis lingulatus Tseng, 1993
 Gamasholaspis malacus Tseng, 1993
 Gamasholaspis nonunguis Tseng, 1993
 Gamasholaspis paravariabilis Ma & Yin, 1999
 Gamasholaspis pygmaeus Ishikawa, 1980
 Gamasholaspis serratus Ishikawa, 1980
 Gamasholaspis uenoi Ishikawa, 1995
Holaspina Berlese, 1916
 Holaspina aboreus (Ishikawa, 1980)
 Holaspina alstoni (Evans, 1956)
 Holaspina bidentis (Tseng, 1993)
 Holaspina coalescens (Krantz, 1960)
 Holaspina comanatus (Tseng, 1993)
 Holaspina communis (Ishikawa, 1966)
 Holaspina cuneatus (Tseng, 1993)
 Holaspina dandongensis (Ma-Liming, 1998)
 Holaspina dentatus (Ishikawa, 1969)
 Holaspina extremiorientalis (Ishikawa, 1980)
 Holaspina hohuanshanensis (Tseng, 1993)
 Holaspina kentinus (Tseng, 1993)
 Holaspina liaoningensis (Ma-Liming, 1998)
 Holaspina marinus (Ishikawa, 1980)
 Holaspina maunaloaensis (Tenerio & Marshall, 1977)
 Holaspina multidentatus (Ishikawa, 1980)
 Holaspina muscorum (Ewing, 1909)
 Holaspina oblongus (Tseng, 1993)
 Holaspina ochraceus (Ishikawa)
 Holaspina paralstoni (Yin & Bei, 1993)
 Holaspina qianshanensis (Yin & Bei, 1993)
 Holaspina sanlinchiensis (Tseng, 1993)
 Holaspina schusteri (Hirschmann, 1966)
 Holaspina serratus (Ishikawa, 1967)
 Holaspina solimani (Metwali, 1983)
 Holaspina tantus (Tseng, 1993)
 Holaspina tenuipes (Berlese, 1904)
 Holaspina trifurcatus (Ishikawa)
 Holaspina tweediei (Evans, 1956)
 Holaspina uozumii (Ishikawa, 2002)
 Holaspina yakushimaensis (Ishikawa, 1980)
Holaspulus Berlese, 1904
 Holaspulus aculeatus Karg, 1994
 Holaspulus apoensis Ishikawa, 1993
 Holaspulus confusus Halliday, 1995
 Holaspulus epistomatus Ishikawa, 1993
 Holaspulus formosanus Tseng, 1993
 Holaspulus ishigakiensis Ishikawa, 1994
 Holaspulus luzonicus Ishikawa, 1993
 Holaspulus montanus Ishikawa, 1995
 Holaspulus omogoensis Ishikawa, 1995
 Holaspulus orientalis Tseng, 1993
 Holaspulus palawanensis Ishikawa, 1993
 Holaspulus primitivus Ishikawa, 1993
 Holaspulus reticulatus Ishikawa, 1994
 Holaspulus sclerus Ishikawa, 1993
 Holaspulus serratus Ishikawa, 1979
 Holaspulus silvestris Ishikawa, 1993
 Holaspulus subtropicus Tseng, 1993
 Holaspulus tenuipes Berlese, 1904
Hyattolaspina A. K. Datta & P. C. Bhattacharjee, 1991
 Hyattolaspina hiteni A. K. Datta & P. C. Bhattacharjee, 1991
Krantzholaspis Petrova, 1967
 Krantzholaspis ussuriensis Petrova, 1967
Krantzolaspina A. K. Datta & P. C. Bhattacharjee, 1988
 Krantzolaspina rebatii A. K. Datta & P. C. Bhattacharjee, 1988
Lattinella Krantz, 1960
 Lattinella capizzii Krantz, 1960
 Lattinella palliolatus (Tseng, 1993)
Neparholaspis Evans, 1956
 Neparholaspis bisunensis Lee & Lee, 2000
 Neparholaspis chenpengi Ma & Yin, 1999
 Neparholaspis longiligulatus Tseng, 1993
 Neparholaspis monticola Ishikawa, 1979
 Neparholaspis serratichela Ishikawa, 1979
 Neparholaspis shinanonis Ishikawa, 1979
 Neparholaspis spathulatus Evans, 1956
 Neparholaspis subarcuatus Ma & Yan, 2001
Parholaspella Krantz, 1960
 Parholaspella spatulata Krantz, 1960
Parholaspis Berlese, 1918
 Parholaspis desertus Berlese, 1918
 Parholaspis meridionalis Ishikawa, 1980
 Parholaspis squameus Tseng, 1993
 Parholaspis wuhanensis Ma & Yan, 2001
Proparholaspulus K. Ishikawa, 1980
 Proparholaspulus angustatus Ishikawa, 1987
 Proparholaspulus ishikawai Liang & Hu, 1993
 Proparholaspulus montanus Ishikawa, 1987
 Proparholaspulus suzukii K. Ishikawa, 1980
Snaveolaspis Johnston, 1969
 Snaveolaspis parvilobatus (Krantz, 1960)

References

Parholaspididae
Acari families